Lawther is a surname, and may refer to:

 Alex Lawther (born 1995), English actor
 Anna B. Lawther (1872–1957), American suffragist
 Cameron Lawther (born 1990), English film producer
 Chas Lawther, British-Canadian actor, comedian and writer
 Derek Lawther, British-American soccer coach and businessman.
 Ian Lawther (1939–2010), Northern Irish footballer
 Joe E. Lawther (1876–1943), American banker and mayor of Dallas
 John Lawther, American college basketball coach and professor
 Melanie Lawther (born 1981), Irish archer
 Steven Lawther, former Head of Communications for the Scottish Labour Party
 Will Lawther (1889–1976), British politician and trade union leader